Mike McBurney (born 12 September 1953) is a Welsh footballer, who played as a forward in the Football League for Tranmere Rovers.

References

1953 births
Living people
Tranmere Rovers F.C. players
Wrexham A.F.C. players
Bolton Wanderers F.C. players
Hartlepool United F.C. players
Blaenau Ffestiniog Amateur F.C. players
English Football League players
Association football forwards
Footballers from Wrexham
Welsh footballers